Komalee Prasad (born 24 August 1995) is an Indian film actress who predominantly works in Telugu films.

Early life
Komalee was born in Visakhapatnam, Andhra Pradesh and brought up in Bellary, Karnataka. She was a dentist by profession before entering films professionally.

Career
Komalee Prasad made her film debut with the Telugu film Nenu Seetha Devi in 2016. She later appeared in the Telugu films Anukunnadi Okati Ayinadi Okati in 2020 and Sebastian P.C. 524 in 2022. She also appeared in the web series Loser and in the anthology series Modern Love Hyderabad in Finding your Penguin.

Filmography

Television

References

External links 

 

1995 births
Living people
Indian film actresses
Actresses in Telugu cinema
21st-century Indian actresses
Telugu actresses
Actresses from Visakhapatnam
People from Bellary